Nusach Ari means, in a general sense, any prayer rite following the usages of Rabbi Isaac Luria, the AriZal, in the 16th century.

History of the Siddur

The Ari and his immediate disciples did not themselves publish any prayer book, though they established a number of characteristic usages intended to be used as additions to the existing Sephardic rite.  After Rabbi Isaac Luria's passing in 1572, there were various attempts, mostly by Sephardic rabbis and communities, to publish a prayer book containing the form of prayer that he used: an example is the Siddur of Rabbi Shalom Sharabi.  Many of these remain in use in Sephardic communities: for more details, see Sephardic Judaism.

It was generally held—even by Luria, the AriZal, himself—that every Jew is bound to observe the mitzvot (commandments of Judaism) by following the customs appropriate to his or her family origin: see Minhag. Originally, Luria taught that twelve gates of prayer exist, one for each of the 12 tribes of Israel, hence twelve nusachs for Jewish prayer ("nusachot ha-tefillah") emanated accordingly. In alteration of this concept, especially in 18th/19th-century Hassidism the claim emerged that a superior Nusach Sefard would reach a believed "thirteenth gate" (Shaar ha-Kollel) in Heaven. 

Prayer books containing some version of the Sephardic rite, as varied by the usages of the Ari, were in use in some Kabbalistic circles in the Ashkenazic world in preference to the traditional Ashkenazic rite.  In particular, they became popular among the early Hasidim.  These prayer books were often found to be inconsistent with the AriZal's version, and served more as a teaching of the kavanot (meditations) and proper ways to pray rather than as an actual prayer book.

Alter Rebbe's edition

In the 18th century, Rabbi Schneur Zalman decided to undertake the task of compiling a prayer book which amalgamated Kabbalistic-Hasidic teachings (including his own) with what he considered to be the most correct version of the Lurianic Sephardic rite. The difference can be seen when comparing Sephardi prayer books containing Lurianic usages with Hasidic versions. The Alter Rebbe, as Schneur Zalman is commonly known, is said to have researched approximately sixty different versions of siddurim so as to come to the most correct version of the liturgical text. In 1803 the Alter Rebbe had the siddur published, and it was released in two volumes to the public. The new siddur was reprinted three times within the first ten years.
While much of Schneur Zalman's siddur is based on the Nusach Ari as composed by the AriZal himself, it is also compiled based on rulings and compositions from various other sources. The Alter Rebbe acknowledged this by entitling his work "Al Pi Nusach Ari," meaning "according to the version of the Ari". It differs from the other versions of the AriZal's siddur by incorporating some features of the Ashkenazic rite. It also contains some meditations from the Siddur of Shalom Sharabi, but very much condensed compared with the original. 

Schneur Zalman's Siddur is used today by Chabad Hasidim (Lubavitch), and the current edition is called Siddur Tehillat Hashem.

Other versions

Many of the other siddurim that are based on the AriZal's siddur are categorized under the title of Nusach Sefard, and are used by sects of Hasidic Judaism.

Almost naturally Nusach Sefard, with its variant Nusach Ari, became predominant among the various sects of Hasidic Judaism. For this reason, a number of  non-Hasidic rabbis (see Mitnagdim) disapprove of the adoption of these different rather recent 18th/19th-century devised customs by Ashkenazi Jews.

Siddurim Adapted from the AriZal's Siddur 
 Siddur Ha-AriZal by Rabbi Asher Margaliot of Brod 
 Siddur Tefillah Yesharah (Siddur Radvil, later published with commentary Keter Nehorah, Berditchev)
 Siddur Tehillat HaShem by Rabbi Shneur Zalman of Liadi
 Siddur Torah Or (Rabbi Shneur Zalman of Liadi's original edition)
 Siddur Tefillot Mikol Hashanah Siddur Od Yosef Hai'' (Baghdadi rite)

See also
Solomon Hanau

References

External links
 A Modern Reconstruction of the AriZal's Siddur
  Earliest Edition of Alter Rebbe's Siddur Discovered

Chabad terminology
Chabad-Lubavitch (Hasidic dynasty)
Shneur Zalman of Liadi
Isaac Luria
Nusachs